Graham Johnson may refer to:

Graham Johnson (musician) (born 1950), British pianist and Lieder accompanist
Graham Johnson (cricketer, born 1946), cricketer with Kent
Graham Johnson (cricketer, born 1958), former English cricketer
Graham Johnson (canoeist) (born 1943), Australian sprint canoeist
Graham Johnson (author) (born 1968), British author and investigative journalist
Graham Johnson (scientist) (born 1973), American medical illustrator

See also
Graham Johnston (disambiguation)